Gary Brandt (born April 11, 1943) is a former professional Canadian football offensive lineman who played eleven seasons in the Canadian Football League for the Saskatchewan Roughriders from 1967 through 1977.

References

 Career stats

1943 births
Living people
Players of Canadian football from Saskatchewan
Canadian football offensive linemen
Saskatchewan Roughriders players
Washington Huskies football players